Pedra Mole is a municipality located in the Brazilian state of Sergipe. Its population was 3,285 (2020) and its area is 82 km².

References

Municipalities in Sergipe